Nancy Lee is a Welsh-born Canadian short story writer and novelist.

Early life

Born in Cardiff, Wales to parents of Chinese and Indian descent, she moved with her family to Vancouver, British Columbia, in childhood.

Literary career

She published her first book of short stories, Dead Girls, in 2003. That book was named book of the year by NOW, and was a finalist for the Ethel Wilson Fiction Prize and the Danuta Gleed Literary Award. The Age, Lee's debut novel, was published by McClelland & Stewart in 2014.

Teaching career

She holds an MFA in creative writing from the University of British Columbia, and is an assistant professor in the creative writing department at University of British Columbia. She has taught in the writing and publishing program at Simon Fraser University and has held a visiting professorship at the University of East Anglia. She was a panelist in the 2003 edition of Canada Reads, defending Yann Martel's novel Life of Pi. In the spring of 2010 she was writer-in-residence at Historic Joy Kogawa House, the writing program that takes place in the childhood home of the author Joy Kogawa (Obasan).

Works
 Dead Girls (2003)
 The Age (2014)

References

21st-century British short story writers
21st-century Canadian novelists
21st-century Canadian short story writers
21st-century Canadian women writers
21st-century Welsh novelists
21st-century Welsh women writers
21st-century Welsh writers
Canadian people of Chinese descent
Canadian people of Indian descent
Canadian women novelists
Canadian writers of Asian descent
Living people
Naturalized citizens of Canada
Writers from Cardiff
Academic staff of Simon Fraser University
University of British Columbia alumni
Welsh emigrants to Canada
Welsh people of Chinese descent
Welsh people of Indian descent
Writers from Vancouver
Canadian women short story writers
British women short story writers
1970 births